The Convention Relative to the Preservation of Fauna and Flora in their Natural State, also known as the London Convention of 1933, was an early agreement among colonial powers for the conservation of nature. As one of the first general conservation agreement in Africa, and the first to specifically protect a plant species, it has been called the Magna Carta of wildlife conservation and "the high point of institutionalised global nature protection before the Second World War".

Political process
The Convention was the result of the 1933 International Conference for the Protection of the Fauna and Flora of Africa, presided over by Richard Onslow, 5th Earl of Onslow, then president of the Society for the Preservation of the Wild Fauna of the Empire. It was based on the London Convention of 1900, which had been agreed to but never came into force due a lack of ratifications.

Signatories of the 1933 convention were Belgium, Egypt, France, Italy, the Anglo-Egyptian Sudan, the Union of South Africa and the United Kingdom and its dependencies. All but France and Spain ratified the agreement in 1935, and British India acceded partially in 1939. In 1950, it was ratified by Portugal and in 1963, then-independent Tanganyika acceded to the convention.

The 1933 London Convention was superseded by the African Convention on the Conservation of Nature and Natural Resources in 1968.

Obligations
The Convention obligated signatories to establish parks and reserves and limit human settlement therein, to domesticate useful animals, and to prohibit unsportsmanlike methods of take. It also required states to give special protection to a list of species.

Species protected
The Convention bestowed varying degrees of protection on two classes of species.

Class A
The 17 mammals, three birds and one plant species in Class A are to be hunted or otherwise killed only by special permission that was to be granted exclusively for scientific research or other critical purposes.

Class B
Authorization for hunting the animals in Class B is allowable by special permit, but for any purpose.

Notes

References

External links
Signature and ratification details
Full text of the Convention

Environmental treaties
Nature conservation in Uganda
Nature conservation in South Africa
Nature conservation in India
Nature conservation in Tanzania
Treaties concluded in 1933
Treaties entered into force in 1936
Treaties of Belgium
Treaties of the Kingdom of Egypt
Treaties of the Kingdom of Italy (1861–1946)
Treaties of Anglo-Egyptian Sudan
Treaties of the Union of South Africa
Treaties of the United Kingdom
Treaties of British India
Treaties of Tanganyika
1933 in London
1936 in the environment
Wildlife law
Biota of Africa
Nature conservation in Africa
Treaties of the Estado Novo (Portugal)
Animal treaties